The Dean Covered Bridge was a Town lattice truss covered bridge, carrying Union Street across Otter Creek in Brandon, Vermont.  Built in 1840, it was one of Vermont's oldest covered bridges at the time of its destruction in 1986 by an arsonist.  It was listed on the National Register of Historic Places, and was replaced by a modern steel and concrete bridge.

Description and history
Union Street is a local road, providing access from the village to the rural southwestern part of the town, and crosses Otter Brook on a roughly northeast-southwest alignment. Laminated stringers had been tied to its underside to add strength, as were iron sway braces. The exterior of the bridge was finished in flush vertical board siding, and it had a gabled slate roof.

The bridge was built about 1838, and was (along with the Sanderson Covered Bridge) one of two surviving 19th-century covered bridges in Brandon at the time of its listing on the National Register in 1974.  The bridge was destroyed by an arsonist in 1986, and has been replaced by a modern steel and concrete bridge.

See also
National Register of Historic Places listings in Rutland County, Vermont
List of Vermont covered bridges
List of bridges on the National Register of Historic Places in Vermont

References

Covered bridges on the National Register of Historic Places in Vermont
Bridges completed in 1840
Covered bridges in Rutland County, Vermont
Buildings and structures in Brandon, Vermont
Demolished bridges in the United States
1840 establishments in Vermont
National Register of Historic Places in Rutland County, Vermont
Road bridges on the National Register of Historic Places in Vermont
Wooden bridges in Vermont
Lattice truss bridges in the United States
Covered bridges in the United States destroyed by arson